"There She Goes" is a song by English rock band the La's, written by the band's frontman, Lee Mavers. The song reached number 13 on the UK Singles Chart when it was re-issued in 1990.

In May 2007, NME magazine placed the song at number 45 in its list of the 50 Greatest Indie Anthems Ever. Predating Britpop by four years, the band's self-titled album was named one of the 40 greatest one-album wonders by Rolling Stone, with the magazine stating, "Whether about heroin or just unrequited love, the La's single 'There She Goes' off their self-titled debut has endured as a founding piece of Britpop's foundation." It was listed at number 22 on NMEs "500 Greatest Songs of All Time".

Lyrics and meaning
The song contains no verses, only a single chorus repeated four times and a bridge.

"There She Goes" has gained a reputation for being about the use of heroin, possibly as a result of the lines: "There she goes again... racing through my brain... pulsing through my vein... no one else can heal my pain". Several newspapers ran articles about the La's and their apparent ode to heroin. When asked about the rumour in 1995, the group's bassist John Power replied: "I don't know. Truth is, I don't wanna know." However, in the book In Search of The La's: A Secret Liverpool (2003) by MW Macefield, ex-La's guitarist Paul Hemmings denied the rumour and added: "Jeremy Fisher, you don't know what you are talking about." In an interview with Les Inrockuptibles, Mavers admits to trying heroin in 1990. The song therefore predated his experience as it was originally released in 1988. Mavers himself has also emphatically denied that the song is about heroin.

The band's guitarist John Byrne said of the song, "I thought it would be big, a lot bigger than it was, but then forgotten like a lot of pop songs. In retrospect, the opposite happened."

Release and reception
The first version of the song, produced by Bob Andrews, was released by the La's in 1988, and again on 2 January 1989. The 1989 release peaked at number 59 on the UK Singles Chart. Andrews' production of the song was remixed by Steve Lillywhite in 1990 for inclusion on their debut album The La's. This remixed version was issued as a single on 22 October 1990 and reached number 13 on the UK Singles Chart.

In May 2007, NME magazine placed "There She Goes" at number 45 in its list of the 50 Greatest Indie Anthems Ever. In 2008, it was also re-released as a vinyl single for its 20th anniversary. A precursor to Britpop, the album was listed at number 13 in Rolling Stone magazine's list of the 40 greatest one-hit wonders. It was listed at number 22 on NMEs list of the "500 Greatest Songs of All Time".

On NPR's All Songs Considered, musician Ben Gibbard selected "There She Goes" as his pick for "perfect song." Gibbard observed that the song "defines the perfectly written pop song: an instantaneously recognizable melody and lyric set to simple, economic musical structure. It is such a simple song that it boggles the mind that someone hadn't already written it." Eric Clapton also praised the song.

In December 2021, Oasis's Noel Gallagher said it was his favourite song from the 1990s; despite technically being released in 1988, the song didn't achieve widespread fame and acclaim until 1990.

Music videos
There are two music videos for this song: a UK version and an international version.

The first video, released in 1988 and directed by Jeff Baynes, was recorded on a camcorder, and was shot in the English countryside and in the band's hometown of Liverpool. It shows the band performing in an alleyway and on a hill, as well as footage from their concerts. The band are also seen in a park. The video ends with a shot of the drum logo. This version was released exclusively for the UK and Irish markets only and uses the single version of the song.

The second music video, released in 1990, was shot in Los Angeles, California. It is the band's first video to feature new lead guitarist Peter Camell and drummer Neil Mavers (Lee's younger brother). It shows the band performing in the streets and neighboring towns of Los Angeles, interspliced with footage of a young woman. The band is also shown performing in front of the Los Angeles skyline as evidenced by the U.S. Bank Tower. The video ends with a shot of the woman's face. This version, dubbed as "American version" and "International version", was released internationally and uses the album version of the song.

Formats and track listings
All songs were written by L.A. Mavers.

1988 7-inch: Go! Discs / GOLAS 2 (UK), 870 987-7 (France)

Side one
 "There She Goes" – 2:31

Side two
 "Come In, Come Out" – 2:10

1988 7-inch EP: Go! Discs / LASEP 2 (UK)

Side one
 "There She Goes" – 2:31
 "Who Knows?" – 3:27

Side two
 "Way Out" (New Version)
 "Come In, Come Out" – 2:10

1988 12-inch: Go! Discs / GOLAS 212 (UK)
Side one
 "There She Goes" – 2:31
 "Come In, Come Out" – 2:10

Side two
 "Who Knows" – 3:27
 "Man I'm Only Human" – 4:50

1988 CD: Go! Discs / LAS CD2 (UK)
 "There She Goes" – 2:31
 "Come In, Come Out" – 2:10
 "Who Knows" – 3:27
 "Man I'm Only Human" – 4:50

1990 7-inch: Go! Discs / GOLAS 5 (UK)
Side one
 "There She Goes" – 2:45

Side two
 "Freedom Song" – 2:26

1990 12-inch: Go! Discs / GOLAS 512 (UK)
Side one
 "There She Goes" – 2:45
 "Freedom Song"- 2:26

Side two
 "All by Myself" – 5:53

1990 Cassette single: Go! Discs / LASMC 5 (UK)
 "There She Goes" – 2:45
 "Freedom Song" – 2:26

1990 CD: Go! Discs / LASCD 5 (UK)
 "There She Goes" – 2:45
 "Freedom Song" – 2:26
 "All by Myself" – 5:53

Limited Edition 7-inch EP: Go! Discs / GOLAB 5 (UK)

Side one
 "There She Goes" – 2:45
 "Freedom Song"- 2:26

Side two
 "All by Myself" – 5:53

Other reissues

CD single (1999)
 "There She Goes"
 "Come In, Come Out"
 "Who Knows?"
 "There She Goes" (video)

7-inch single (2008)
 "There She Goes" (John Leckie version)
 "There She Goes" (original single version)
 "Way Out" (original single version)

Personnel
The La's
 Lee Mavers – lead vocals and backing vocals, acoustic guitar
 John Power – bass and backing vocals
 John "Boo" Byrne – electric guitar
 Chris Sharrock – drums and tambourine

Production
 Bob Andrews – producer
 Dave Charles – engineer
 Jeremy Allom – engineer, producer (on "All by Myself")
 Mike Haas – engineer (on "All by Myself")
 Steve Lillywhite – producer, mixing (on "Freedom Song"), remixing (on "There She Goes" 1990 version)
 Mark Wallis – additional producer, engineer (on "Freedom Song")

Other personnel
 Ryan Art – design

Charts

Certifications

Sixpence None the Richer version

American Christian alternative rock band Sixpence None the Richer released a cover version of the song in July 1999 as the second single from their third studio album, Sixpence None the Richer (1997). The band's rendition of the song reached number two in Iceland, number 12 in Canada, number 14 on the UK Singles Chart, and number 32 on the US Billboard Hot 100.

Track listings
UK CD and cassette single
 "There She Goes" (LP version) – 2:42
 "There She Goes" (Ben Grosse mix) – 2:42
 "Kiss Me" (acoustic version) – 3:12

UK 7-inch single and European CD single
A. "There She Goes" (LP version) – 2:42
B. "Kiss Me" (acoustic version) – 3:12

Australian CD single
 "There She Goes" (album mix) – 2:42
 "There She Goes" (remix) – 2:42
 "Kiss Me" (live in Hollywood, 12 February 1998) – 3:28

Charts

Weekly charts

Year-end charts

Release history

In media
It has appeared on several film soundtracks, including The Parent Trap; Fever Pitch; Girl, Interrupted; Cold Case; The Adventures of Pete and Pete; Snow Day; and So I Married an Axe Murderer (where both the original and The Boo Radleys version appear). It also opens the "Pilot" episode of Gilmore Girls. Sixpence None the Richer's version of the song was used in Family Guy and the commercials for birth-control company Ortho Tri-Cyclen Lo from 2004–2005.

The song was also used for the opening montage of the first episode of Channel 4's drama series This Is England '90, which also featured outgoing Prime Minister Margaret Thatcher's resignation speech.

The song was used frequently for slow-motion scenes with Nori in the U.S. TV series Me, Myself & I.

The BBC comedy drama There She Goes was named after the song, as the show’s creator Shaun Pye listened to it whilst writing the first script.

References

1988 singles
1988 songs
1990 singles
1999 singles
2008 singles
Go! Discs singles
The La's songs
Sixpence None the Richer songs
Songs written by Lee Mavers
Dream pop songs